Osádka is a village and municipality in Dolný Kubín District in the Zilina Region of northern Slovakia.

History
In historical records the village was first mentioned in 1381.

Geography
The municipality lies at an altitude of 670 metres and covers an area of 4.710 km². It has a population of about 140 people.

References

Villages and municipalities in Dolný Kubín District